Jonas Holmkvist (born 17 August 1982) is a former Swedish cyclist.

Palmares

2002
1st  National Team Time Trial Championships (with Erik Wendel and Gustav Larsson)
1st Scandinavian Open Road Race
2003
1st  National Road Race Championships
1st Overall Ringerike GP
1st Stages 1 & 4
1st Stages 2 & 6 FDB Insurance Rás
2004
1st Stage 5 Course de la Solidarité Olympique
2005
8th Classic Loire Atlantique
9th Tour du Finistère

References

1982 births
Living people
Swedish male cyclists
Sportspeople from Halmstad
Sportspeople from Halland County